Breda International Airport is a small general aviation airfield located next to the A58 motorway on the outskirts of Bosschenhoofd, a village in the municipality of Halderberge in the province of North Brabant in the Netherlands.

Originally called Seppe Airport (after the nickname of Bosschenhoofd), the airport started in 1949 as a glider field and has been used by powered aircraft since 1969. In 2002, the grass runway surface was replaced with asphalt. The airfield is not used by aircraft using jet engines. Around 50,000 airplane movements (take-offs or landings) are made at Seppe annually. In February 2014, it was announced that the name of the airport would be changed to Breda International Airport. The airport was officially renamed on 1 January 2015.

The airfield is also home to a small flying museum, Vliegend Museum Seppe (The Flying Museum of Seppe), displaying various aircraft, most of which are still airworthy, including two de Havilland Tiger Moths, a Boeing Stearman and a Yakovlev Yak-52.

The airfield additionally houses Aviation Performance Solutions, an aviation training company specializing in Upset Prevention and Recovery Training (UPRT).

References

External links
 Breda International Airport, official website
 Photos taken at Seppe Airport from Airliners.net
 Vliegend museum Seppe

Airports in North Brabant
Transport in Breda
Halderberge